The National School of Business Management (also known as NSBM Green University) is a government recognized degree awarding institute in Sri Lanka. It was granted the degree awarding status by the Ministry of Education under Section 25A of the Universities Act No. 16 of 1978 and established under the Companies Act No. 07 of 2007 having the registration Number PB 4833.

NSBM Green University offers undergraduate and postgraduate degrees in the fields of Business, Computing, Engineering, Science and Design. It is located in Pitipana, Homagama, in the Colombo suburbs.

History 
National School of Business Management was founded in 2011 as the degree awarding university under the National Institute of Business Management to award undergraduate and post-graduate degrees. Followed by a series of government protocols, the approval was granted to set up a higher education institute named National School of Business Management (NSBM). It was registered as a limited company under the Companies Act No. 7 of 2007. The first Board of Directors of the company was appointed in July 2011, consisting of 5 members. In the wake of the discussions about the location of the proposed institute, a land of 26 acres in Pitipana, Homagama was selected and later obtained in December 2011. The NSBM Green University Town project's construction work officially began at an investment of 10.2 billion LKR in 2013, after clearing government sanctions and approvals. While the construction was underway, NSBM commenced its operations as a city campus.

NSBM city campus was launched in Nugegoda with a modest organizational structure consisting of School of Business, School of Computing, Finance Division, and Administration Division. On 25th February 2012, it officially began the education delivery process inaugurating the first set of students for the University College Dublin and the UGC approved degree programs. Later the same year, the city campus expanded its presence with the addition of three new buildings in close proximity to the main building. Over the period of the next four years since its inception, the city campus continued till it was moved to NSBM Green University Town premises. Along the way, more undergraduate and postgraduate degrees programs and new academic partnerships were added to the NSBM profile. These comprise the Management, Computing, Engineering, and Design degrees offered by NSBM or affiliated with Plymouth University, UK, Victoria University, Australia and Limkokwing University of Creative Technology, Malaysia.

The construction of the NSBM Green University Town was carried out by MAGA Engineering (Pvt.) Ltd together with the design and consultation of Engineering Consultancy (Pvt.) Ltd. On 26th October 2016, the newly constructed university complex was ceremonially declared open, concluding a construction project spanned over two years and ten months.

Administration and governance 
The highest administration and academic official of NSBM Green University is the Vice Chancellor/CEO. The Vice Chancellor chairs the NSBM Board of Directors and also serves as the head of the university Senate, Audit Committee, and the Senior Management. The position is currently held by Prof. E.A. Weerasinghe, the founder of the university.

The Deputy Vice Chancellor is the second highest administration and academic official of NSBM Green University. Prof. Chaminda Rathnayake presently serves as the Deputy Vice Chancellor.

The Board of Directors is the governing and executive body of NSBM Green University. The Board consists of 15 members. It is responsible for the management, finance, property, investment and general operations of NSBM.

Academic Profile

Admission 
The student selection and the admission procedure of NSBM Green University is carried out independently by the university itself. NSBM offers two intakes annually. The 1st intake usually starts in March, whereas the 2nd intake begins in October each year. The students need to apply directly to the university. The student selection is carried out based on the student admission policy of NSBM, considering the standard examination results and institutional requirements.

NSBM also offers admission to the students applied under the Interest Free Student Loan Scheme introduced by the State Ministry of Higher Education in which the ministry manages the application and registration process.

Faculties and Departments 
A range of undergraduate, postgraduate and professional/ executive programs are taught at NSBM through a network of faculties and departments.

Faculty of Business 
Faculty of Business of NSBM offers BSc., BBM, BM, BA, and Bachelor of Business degrees and postgraduate programs in the fields of Business, Management, and Commerce, including disciplines associated with Accounting, Finance, International Business, Industrial Management, Project Management, Logistics Management, Human Resource Management, Tourism and Hospitality Management, Marketing Management and Business Communication. It is also the largest faculty of NSBM Green University, in terms of student population.

Departments 

 Department of Legal Studies
 Department of Economics and Decision Sciences
 Department of Operations and Logistics
 Department of Marketing and Tourism Management
 Department of Accounting and Finance
 Department of Management

Faculty of Computing 
The Faculty of Computing provides education and training in the areas of Computer Science, Software Engineering, Computer Networks, Management Information Systems, Data Science, Computer Security and Information Technology at undergraduate and postgraduate levels.

Departments 

 Department of Data Science
 Department of Network and Security
 Department of Computer Science and Software Engineering
 Department of Information and Systems Sciences

Faculty of Engineering 
Engineering, Quantity Surveying, Interior Design, and Multimedia degree programs are conducted under the Faculty of Engineering.

Departments 

 Department of Electrical, Electronic and Systems Engineering
 Department of Mechatronic and Industry Engineering
 Department of Design Studies

Faculty of Science 
The Faculty of Science, offers BSc. Degrees in Biomedical Science and Public Health & Nutrition under the Department of Biomedical Science.

Faculty of Postgraduate Studies and Professional Advancement 
The Faculty of Postgraduate Studies and Professional Advancement is the latest addition to the network of faculties at NSBM. It is responsible for conducting and facilitating postgraduate education in the university through programs ranging from doctoral studies(PhD), master's degrees and professional advancement programs.

Research 
NSBM Green University conducts international and local university collaborative research projects, international research conferences, industry lead collaborative research, and research specialized workshops and training under the NSBM Research Council. The university provides internal/external research grants for impactful research of both the staff and the students.

The university has 23 research centers under the three main faculties of NSBM: Faculty of Business, Faculty of Computing, and Faculty of Engineering. The existing research-led initiatives in NSBM include the International Conference on Business Innovation(ICOBI), which has been taking place since 2018, the NSBM Journal of Management, a refereed academic journal published bi-annually providing a scholarly platform for critical and informed articles in all fields of management, and the Business Dialogue magazine, the bi-annual magazine through which the university actively engages with the industry in search of research collaborations and partnerships.

Affiliations and memberships

Affiliations 
NSBM Green University has been partnered up with several international universities since its establishment. Currently, NSBM through its partnerships with University of Plymouth, United Kingdom and Victoria University, Australia offer degrees in the fields of Business, Computing, Interior Design and Quantity Surveying.

Memberships 
NSBM is a member of the Association to Advance Collegiate Schools of Business (AACSB International), Association of Commonwealth Universities (ACU), Institutional Membership of Asia Pacific Quality Network (APQN), and United Nations initiative of Sustainable Development Solutions Network (SDSN).

Student Life

Clubs and Societies 
There are over 50 student-led clubs and societies registered at NSBM Green University. They are categorized as Academic Clubs, Activity-Based Clubs, International Clubs, Sports Clubs, and Religious Clubs. They all serve the common purpose of personality development and networking.

Sports 
NSBM has more than 16 sports clubs, of which many participated and secured victories in several international and national sports championships and tournaments.

Further, the university organized and hosted many sports leagues, sports festivals, and colors awarding ceremonies.

Special Events 
NSBM is home to various special events. The university conducted many special events, from religious events to community development projects and entertaining events in support of the active social life at the university.

Career Guidance 
NSBM carries out student career guidance, student internship placement, and graduate job placement through the NSBM Career Guidance Unit. The unit is also responsible for organizing career fair, industry visits, workshops, professional development programs, and guest lectures whilst maintaining industry partnerships.

Campus

Academic and Administration Buildings 
The NSBM Green University declared open in 2016, is a purpose-built building complex spread over an area of 26 acres in Homagama. The building complex mainly comprises the Main Auditorium, Program Office, Student Centre, Library, Administration Building, and the buildings housing the faculties. These buildings are connected with a road network giving easy access. The facilities provided in this building complex include lecture halls, laboratories, library, audio-visual facility, IT facility, medical center, bookshop, cafeterias, restaurant, mini supermarket, salon, gift shop, banking facility, study areas, and open-air theatre.

Sports and Recreation Buildings 
The university town houses a recreational building which consists of a gymnasium, outdoor sports ground, cricket nets and an observation deck, pavilion, and tiered seating for over 600 average spectators, a swimming pool with six lanes, and a multi-purpose indoor sports building including a basketball court, badminton court and a table tennis court.

Accommodation 
The university provides student and staff accommodation facilities. The student accommodation facility of 10 floors has the capacity to house nearly 500 students with over 250 fully furnished bedrooms on a twin sharing basis. There is a choice of apartments available for staff in a building of seven floors.

NSBM Green University Town Phase II 

NSBM also announced plans to build new faculty buildings and student accommodation facilities on another 15 acres adjoining the existing university premises, under NSBM Green University Town Phase II project. With the new addition the University premises is presently spread over an extent of 41 acres. The facility centers, when complete, will enhance the university’s capacity in the areas of imparting education, accommodation, recreation as well ancillary services.

Environmental Sustainability 
NSBM Green University has adopted many green practices and maintained environmental sustainability, aligning with its ‘Green University’ concept. Accordingly, defining the theme ‘In harmony with nature’, the university has developed sub-themes such as reducing the potential environmental impact, focusing on reducing energy, water and waste management, improving indoor environmental quality for better health well-being, and providing direction for continual improvement.

NSBM received the gold certificate for two consecutive years in 2019 and 2020, under Singapore affiliated CIOB (Ceylon Institute of Builders) Green Mark rating system, certifying that it has maintained the required Green Building Standards for the gold level of certification.

Further reading 

 Section 25A of the Universities Act No. 16 of 1978
 Companies Act No. 07 of 2007

References

External links
 Official website
 Map of NSBM Green University

Business schools in Sri Lanka
Universities and colleges in Colombo District
Universities in Sri Lanka